Praecereus is genus of cactus. It is sometimes included in the genus Cereus.

Description
Plants have a bushy to tree-like species that are sometimes stretched out, mostly freely branched and reach a height of up to 6 meters. The slender, columnar to hanging shoots have 7 or more ribs with protruding, round and gray areoles from which needle-like or umbilical thorns arise.

The robust, funnel- to bell-shaped flowers are white to yellowish green and open during the day. Its strong flower cup and flower tube are thick-walled, fleshy and often curved.

The fleshy, short, ovoid fruits that split open lengthwise are red with a persistent flower residue and contain white flesh. The black, bumpy seeds are oblong and ovoid and somewhat compressed at the sides.

Species
Species as of 2021:

References

 
Cactoideae genera